The Chief of  Army Staff (COAS) (unofficially known as the Army Chief) is a statutory position in the Indian Army held usually by a four star general. As the highest ranking officer to serve solely in the Indian Army, the chief is the professional head of the ground forces and a key adviser to the Minister of Defence. The COAS, in a separate capacity, is also a member of the National Security Council and thereby an advisor to the president and the prime minister. The COAS is typically the most senior army officer in the Indian Armed Forces, unless the Chief of Defence Staff  and/or the Chairman Chiefs of Staff Committee is an army officer.

Office of the Chief of  Army Staff

The post of Commander-in-Chief, India was established in 1748 to designate the commander of all forces of East India Company. 

After 1857 , the Commander-in-Chief become the supreme commander of the British Indian Army. The C-in-C was also the overall head of the armed forces of the British India including the Royal Indian Air Force and Royal Indian Navy. The Commander-in-Chief was also closely in contact with Office of the Viceroy of India.

After partition in 1947 the post of Commander-in-Chief was divided into:- Commander-in-Chief of Indian Army, Commander-in-Chief of Pakistan Army and Commander-in-Chief of British Forces in India and Pakistan.  At Independence, the head of the Indian Army was designated as the "Commander-in-Chief, Indian Army". On 21 June 1948, the title of "Chief of the Army Staff" was added, with the post correspondingly re-designated as the "Chief of the Army Staff and Commander-in-Chief, Indian Army". The designation was again changed to "Chief of the Army Staff" through the Commanders-In-Chief (Change in Designation) Act ,1955. The office is based at South Block of the Central Secretariat at Raisina Hill, New Delhi.

Appointments to the office are made by the Appointments Committee of the Cabinet (ACC). The COAS reaches superannuation upon three years in the office or at the age of 62, whichever is earlier.

Appointees

The following table chronicles the appointees to the office of the Chief of the Army Staff or its preceding positions since the independence of India. Ranks and honours are as at the completion of their tenure:

Commander-in-Chief, Indian Army (1947–1955)

Chief of the Army Staff (1955–present)

See also

 Commander-in-Chief, India
 Chief of the General Staff 
 Field Marshal of the Indian Army
 Chief of Defence Staff
 Chairman of the Chiefs of Staff Committee
 Chief of Integrated Defence Staff
 Vice Chief of the Army Staff
 Chief of the Naval Staff
 Chief of the Air Staff
 List of serving generals of the Indian Army

Notes

References

Sources
 

C
India
Indian military appointments
Indian Army appointments